St. Gallen Haggen railway station is a railway station in the Bruggen neighborhood of St. Gallen, in the Swiss canton of St. Gallen. It is an intermediate station on the Bodensee–Toggenburg railway and is served by local trains only.

Services 
St. Gallen Haggen is served by three services of the St. Gallen S-Bahn:

 : hourly service between Nesslau-Neu St. Johann and Altstätten SG.
 : hourly service via Sargans (circular operation).
 : hourly service between Herisau and St. Gallen.

References

External links 
 
 St. Gallen Haggen station on SBB

Railway stations in the canton of St. Gallen
Südostbahn stations
Buildings and structures in St. Gallen (city)